Thanopoulos is a Greek surname.

Notable people
Notable people with this surname include:
 Dimitrios Thanopoulos (born 1959), Greek wrestler
 Dimitris Thanopoulos (born 1987), Greek footballer
 Elefthérios Thanópoulos, racewalker who holds the Greek record for the 10,000-m track